European route E38 is a road part of the International E-road network. It begins in Hlukhiv, Ukraine and ends in Shymkent, Kazakhstan.

The E38 is the only signposted European route in Kazakhstan. While the country has a few E-routes other than E38, none of those were signposted.

Route 

 : Hlukhiv (E105)

 38K-017: Rylsk - Lgov - Kurchatov
 38K-010: Kurchatov - Kursk (E105)
 : within Kursk
 : Kursk - Voronezh (E115) - Borisoglebsk (E119)
 : Borisoglebsk - Saratov
 : Saratov - Yershov - Ozinki

 : Oral (E121)
 : Oral - Kyzylorda (E123 / E004) - Shymkent (E40)

References

External links 
 UN Economic Commission for Europe: Overall Map of E-road Network (2007)

 
38
European routes in Ukraine
E38
E038